Pusilhá is an archaeological site in Belize. The location of this Late Classic Maya urban complex, along the east and west flow of trade, made the city a major transfer point for economic activities in the whole region. In addition, the city gave archaeologists a historical view of a secondary Maya site. Large and extended excavation efforts have changed the overall picture of Maya social and political relationships between larger and smaller cities and challenged the prevailing view of conquest and absorption of smaller cities into the larger cities in the region. The research conducted at Pusilhá began in 1927 and continues to this day.

Location
The site of Pusilhá is located in the Toledo district of Belize in the town of San Benito Poité. Situated between the Poite and Pusilha rivers that run east and west may have had an impact of why the Maya urban complex was built there. The site is also located favorably between the Caribbean to the south and the Maya Mountains to the east. Pusilhá was also situated in the region for the flow of goods and ideas from the central lowlands and southeastern periphery located in Honduras.  With the major Maya urban sites of central lowlands at Caracol and Tikal and the southern lowland site of Copan, Pusilhá was possibly a major transfer point for economic activities in the whole of the lowland region.

Excavation
The initial site survey was conducted in 1927 by archaeologists from the British Museum Expedition to British Honduras that was led by Thomas Joyce.  The survey led to the removal of the best preserved stelae from Pusilhá to the British Museum in London.  The survey yielded dates and calendrical glyphs that were included in Sylvanus G. Morley's discussion work The Inscriptions of Petén. Thomas Joyce also conducted an extensive ceramics evaluation in 1929.  In the intervening 70 years very little research has been done at Pusilhá.  This state of affairs has changed with research and excavations carried out by Geoffrey Braswell and the Pusilha Archaeological Project beginning in 2001.  The excavation that has continued to present has exposed three major areas at the center of Pusilhá to archaeological interpretation.

History

Pusilhá has a series of confirmed occupation dates.  It is known through ceramic analysis that this site is dateable to the late classic.  A stela found on site indicates a late classic occupation.  According to Braswell, the current excavator of the site, "Stela P begins with the initial series date of 9.7.0.0.0 and contains a historical retrospective date of 9.6.17.8.18 (A.D. 570), implying that the kingdom was founded shortly before the beginning of the Late Classic period".  He does state that excavations from surrounding residential areas away from the complexes center seem to indicate an early classic occupation but additional excavation is required to confirm this for the rest of the site. Transitions in ceramics, burials and construction coupled with the usual cessation of inscriptions on stelae indicate continued occupation at Pusilhá through to the post classic.  The last official date, which is a calendar round date, occurs at  9.18.7.10.3, or A. D. 798.

Political
The initial excavation and surveys seem to show that politically Pusilhá was a second tier polity.  The ceramics evidence showed that there were ties to Copan and Quirigua. It also seems likely that there were connections between Tikal and Caracol as those polities rose to prominence in the Petén. Based in part to the favorable location of Pusilhá along both east and west corridors of trade and the north and south axis of influence that had Caracol to the north and Copan to the south it seemed likely that the polity was politically dependent to one of its larger neighbors. But the current archaeological evidence indicates that Pusilhá maintained its independence.

Ruling Elite
The archaeological evidence indicates that Pusilhá was a traditional Maya "elite" led urban complex.  There are known to be eight rulers that are associated with the Pusilhá emblem glyph from the late Classic period with a possible two additional from the Terminal Classic. In total there are 39 named individuals that have been discovered by the epigraphers in the hieroglyphic record. Of note is an individual who at first was linked as a ruler of Copan based on the artifactual record of that polity. K'ahk' Uti' Chan is the name of Ruler B of Pusilhá as well as Ruler 11 at Copan and was first ascribed to be the same individual. Further research has shown that they were contemporaries to each other that had  different known parentage.

Site Significance
The site of Pusilhá has the one representation of bridge construction that has survived to modern time. The polity of Pusilhá also offers a look at the quantity and quality of the stelae available for study from a secondary urban complex. This site may represent an alternative method of looking at how the Maya govern themselves that is contrary to prevailing view of conquest and absorption of smaller cities into the larger cities in the region. To truly understand this site it must be stated that research and excavation is at a very early stage and that more work is required to fully understand the place that Pusilhá holds in the greater Maya world.

See also
Maya civilization
Trade in Maya civilization
Maya stelae

Footnotes

References 

 
 
 
 
 
 
 Culbert, T. Patrick, and Don S. Rice (eds.). 1990. Precolumbian Population History in the Maya Lowlands. Albuquerque: University of New Mexico Press
 Foias, Antonia E., 1996, Changing Ceramic Production and Exchange Systems and the Classic Maya Collapse in the Petexbatun Region. PhD. Dissertation, Department of Anthropology, Vanderbilt University, Microfilms, Ann Arbor.
 
 Sheptak, Russell N., 1987 Interaction between Belize and the Ulua Valley. In Interaction on the Southeast Mesoamerican Frontier: Prehistoric and Historic Honduras and El Salvador, edited by Eugenia J. Robinson. BAR International Series 327, Oxford.
 Thompson, John 1928 Some new dates from Pusilha. Man xxviii:95.

External links 
Raz jade mask, Pusilha http://www.wayeb.org/drawings/raz_jade_mask.png
Stele http://www.wayeb.org/drawings/pus_st_d.png
Pusilha Archaeological Project (PUSAP) http://dss.ucsd.edu/~gbraswel/pusap.html

Maya sites in Belize
Former populated places in Belize
Toledo District
Mesoamerica
Classic period in the Americas
Pre-Columbian cultural areas
Indigenous peoples of Central America
History of Petén
Maya sites that survived the end of the Classic Period